The 1985 Rous Cup was the first staging of the Rous Cup international football competition, initially established to continue the then-traditional annual game between rivals England and Scotland following the demise of the British Home Championship.

The cup was won by Scotland, who defeated England 1–0 in the match played on 25 May 1985. Richard Gough scored the only goal of the game, a header in the 69th minute. This was to be the only time they lifted the Rous Cup during its five-year existence.

Match details

References

Rous Cup
Rous
Rous
International association football competitions hosted by Scotland
Scotland national football team matches
England national football team matches
Football in Glasgow
1980s in Glasgow
England–Scotland football rivalry
May 1985 sports events in the United Kingdom